Cornut-Gentille is a double-barrelled surname.

People with the surname 

 Bernard Cornut-Gentille (1909 –1992), French politician
 François Cornut-Gentille (born 1958), French politician

References 

Surnames
Surnames of French origin
French-language surnames
Compound surnames